(Hail Holy Queen, literally: Hail, Queen) is a Marian anthem, a setting by Arvo Pärt of the Latin hymn "Salve Regina" for mixed choir and organ in 2001. It was first performed in Essen Cathedral on 22 May 2002. It was published by Universal Edition in 2002. Pärt arranged the composition for choir, celesta and string orchestra in 2011 for a celebration of 150 years of Italian unity.

History 
 was commissioned for the celebration on 22 May 2002 of 1150 years since the foundation of Stift Essen (Essen Abbey) and the city of Essen. The day was also the 75th birthday of Hubert Luthe, then Bishop of Essen, to whom the work is dedicated. It was Luthe's wish to have a setting of this text to venerate the Golden Madonna.

 was performed by three choirs of the cathedral with the organist Jürgen Karsawa, conducted by Wolfgang Endrös. The work in one movement takes about 12 minutes to perform. It was published by Universal Edition in July 2002.

Pärt arranged the composition for choir, celesta and string orchestra in 2011 for a celebration of 150 years of Italian unity.

Music 

The work in E minor is mostly in 3/4 time. After an instrumental introduction of 12 measure, all parts sing the greeting "" in unison, marked piano (soft). After four instrumental measures the theme is continued, again in unison with a falling line of even long notes: "" (mother of mercy), after two instrumental measures followed by "" (sweet life), after two more measures "" (and our hope, hail).

For the following petition, the voices are divided in an upper choir of three women's voices, singing "" (To you we cry), and a lower choir of three men's voices continuing "" (exiles, sons of Eve), alternating as in psalm recitation. While the instrumental interludes and accompaniment move in even quarter notes, sometimes even livelier, the voices stay on each note for at least a measure, often for several measures on one syllable. The dynamics remain soft, intensified to no more than mp (mezzo-piano) in the middle of the phrases. For the next petition, the upper chorus is formed by soprano, alto and tenor, singing "" (To you we sigh), continued by alto, tenor and bass: "" (mourning and weeping in this valley of tears). The petitions are repeated, more intensely by a division in eight vocal parts, but still piano.

Only tenor and bass begin a new section, marked mp: "" (therefore, our advocate). The text "" (your merciful eyes towards us turn) is expressed, marked "" (slowing) and mf, in polyphony, with the voices picking up the instrumental quarter note movement. In contrast, "" (and Jesus, the blessed fruit of your womb) is rendered in mysterious pianissimo unison, followed, after a general pause by a sudden strong outburst: "" (to us after this exile show), on mostly dissonant chords, one every measure, ending on an eight-part unresolved chord.

The final line is soft again and for the first time in 4/4 time. The text "" (O merciful, o good, o sweet virgin Mary) is divided in four parts, separated by instrumental measures. While the sopranos and altos sing long chords, the tenors and basses repeat in unison each phrase three times, the last one, in 6/4 time, even five times, slowing down. After a last instrumental phrase, the composer requests a full measure of silence.

A program note comments: "it builds very gradually to a late, majestic climax—unison vocal lines at the outset, broader harmonies later, some intriguing eccentricities in the organ part along the way".

Recordings 

It was recorded in 2003 in the presence of the composer at London's Temple Church.

 is part of a collection of music by Pärt titled , performed by the Estonian Philharmonic Chamber Choir, conducted by Paul Hillier, with organist Christopher Bowers-Broadbent.

References

External links 

 
 
 

Compositions by Arvo Pärt
Part
2001 compositions
Compositions in E minor